Barziya Peak is the mostly ice-covered peak rising to 1500 m in the south part of Pernik Peninsula, Loubet Coast in Graham Land, Antarctica. The feature has steep and partly ice-free southwest and northwest slopes, surmounting Field Glacier to the north and west, and its tributary Narezne Glacier to the southwest.

The peak is named after the settlement of Barziya in Northwestern Bulgaria.

Location
British mapping in 1978.

Maps
 Antarctic Digital Database (ADD). Scale 1:250000 topographic map of Antarctica. Scientific Committee on Antarctic Research (SCAR). Since 1993, regularly upgraded and updated.
British Antarctic Territory. Scale 1:200000 topographic map. DOS 610 Series, Sheet W 67 66. Directorate of Overseas Surveys, Tolworth, UK, 1978.

References
 Bulgarian Antarctic Gazetteer. Antarctic Place-names Commission. (details in Bulgarian, basic data in English)
Barziya Peak. SCAR Composite Antarctic Gazetteer.

External links
 Barziya Peak. Copernix satellite image

Mountains of Graham Land
Bulgaria and the Antarctic
Loubet Coast